Elizabeth Jeffries (1727, Bridgnorth, Shropshire – 28 March 1752 in Leytonstone, England) was an English woman executed for murder.

When she was five years old, Elizabeth was adopted by her wealthy and childless uncle Joseph Jeffries, who had made his fortune as a butcher in Central London. Jeffries sexually violated his niece when she was fifteen. He had willed her everything he owned but hypocritically continually threatened to write her out of the will because of her immoral behaviour.

Murder
Elizabeth started an affair with her uncle's man-servant, John Swan. When it seemed increasingly likely that her uncle would carry out his threat regarding the will, she and Swan plotted to kill her uncle. They paid a man named Matthews to get them a brace of pistols. Matthews saw Elizabeth and John in the house on the night of the murder on 3 July 1751, and learned what they intended to do, but John made him swear not to tell anyone. She and John then went upstairs and killed her uncle. They made it seem as though her uncle had been the victim of a botched robbery and raised the alarm. Elizabeth was arrested; however, she was released when no evidence could be found. The police then began a search for Matthews, whom she had implicated. He was located and told the police everything he knew. She and John were imprisoned to await trial.

Trial and execution
The trial of Jeffries and Swan began eight months later, on 10 March 1752. She and John were swiftly convicted and sentenced to hang. On 28 March she was taken to the gallows in a cart and riding on her own coffin, while John was dragged on a sledge for committing alleged petty treason. Their legs were not tied and they were not blindfolded. A crowd of 7,000 people gathered to watch them hang. Neither Elizabeth nor John acknowledged one another, while the hangman cracked his whip and drove the cart out from under them. John died in less than five minutes. Elizabeth, however, being lighter than Swan, took over fifteen minutes to die, struggling to the end.

References 

1727 births
People executed by the Kingdom of Great Britain
People executed for murder
Executed people from Shropshire
British female murderers
Executed English women
People executed by England and Wales by hanging
People convicted of murder by England and Wales
English people convicted of murder
1751 crimes
People from Bridgnorth
1752 deaths